Cosmos is the sixteenth studio album by the Brazilian musician Rogério Skylab. The first part of a planned trilogy, the "Trilogia do Cosmos", it was released on October 2, 2020 and is available for free download on the musician's official website and for streaming.

Skylab originally announced the trilogy on his official Facebook page on August 19, 2020, claiming that its first installment would be released "in the next month or so"; four months prior, on March 19, the single "À Sombra de um Horizonte" came out as a teaser. In a later Facebook post, he elaborated that the trilogy was conceived as "an homage to three of the greatest Brazilian composers: Moacir Santos, Eumir Deodato and Hermeto Pascoal"; thus being, it follows a minimalistic sonority "based around piano, acoustic bass and drums" inspired by samba, bossa nova and MPB, and heavily reminiscent of his 2012–15 Trilogia dos Carnavais.

"Marcha Fúnebre" was re-recorded from Skylab's 2009 collaborative album with Zumbi do Mato bassist Zé Felipe, Rogério Skylab & Orquestra Zé Felipe; his second re-recording from such album following "Tem Cigarro Aí?" on his previous output Crítica da Faculdade do Cu. "O Corpo Real da Paolla" was inspired by an article regarding actress Paolla Oliveira.

Critical reception
Writing for webzine Acrobata, Aristides Oliveira gave Cosmos a very favorable review, calling it a "great album" and praising Skylab's "musical maturation"; nevertheless, he stated that "those who are used to Skylab's rock phase might not like it".

Track listing

Personnel
 Rogério Skylab – vocals, production
 Leandro Braga – piano, arrangements
 Rodrigo Scofield – drums
 Pedro Aune – bass guitar, acoustic bass
 Solange Venturi – photography
 Carlos Mancuso – cover art

References

2020 albums
Rogério Skylab albums
Self-released albums
Albums free for download by copyright owner